Churchgate (Marathi pronunciation: [t͡ʃəɾt͡ʃɡeːʈ]) is area in the southern part of Mumbai close to Arabian Sea.  The area is known for unique architecture consisting of art deco style residential buildings, access to sporting venues, and business district of Nariman Point.

History 

During the eighteenth and up to the mid-19th century, Mumbai was a walled city surrounded by a fortification. The city walls had three gates. One of the gates, Churchgate, was named after St. Thomas Cathedral, Mumbai.  The area west of the original gate came to be known as Churchgate. In the mid-19th century, the wall of the fort along with its gates were torn down to aid in the expansion of city. . At the exact location of the Churchgate, Flora Fountain was built.

Geography 
Arabian Sea is situated at west and Nariman Point on south of Churchgate.
Churchgate railway station is a major railway terminus on the Western line of the Mumbai Suburban Railway.

2008 Mumbai attacks 

On November 26th 2008, a Pakistan trained Lashkar-e-Taiba terrorist attacked the Trident hotel and the Oberoi hotel. This attack ended up killing as many as 30 people. The hotels are situated on the southern border of Churchgate in the Nariman Point area. The attacks were part of a larger Mumbai terrorist attack, which killed 166 and injured 238 in an unprecedented Islamic terrorist  attack.  In response, Mumbai police killed one terrorist and apprehended another, Ajmal Kasab, along with which the National Security Guards (NSG) killed 8 other terrorists.

Places
Following places are located in Churchgate area of Mumbai: 
 Cricket centre - headquarters and office of Board of Control for Cricket in India
 Wankhede stadium - an international cricket Stadium
 Mumbai Cricket Association - headquarters of  Mumbai cricket 
 Marine drive - a sea side road 
 Cricket Club of India (CCI)- an exclusive sports club for rich elites
 Brabourne Stadium - an old cricket stadium, owned by CCI
 Churchgate railway station

Colleges
 Jamnalal Bajaj Institute of Management Studies
 H.R. College of Commerce and Economics
 Government Law College, Mumbai
K.C College
K.C. Law College
 Jai Hind College
 Sydenham College
 Elphinstone College
SNDT Women's University

Sights
Tourist spots in the Churchgate area include:
Hutatma Chowk 
Maharashtra High Court
Oval Maidan

.

References 
 

Neighbourhoods in Mumbai